Crocker Mountain or Mount Crocker may refer to:

 Crocker Mountain (Maine), United States
 Mount Crocker, California, United States
 Mount Crocker, east of Comet, Queensland, Australia

See also
 South Crocker Mountain, Maine
 Crocker Mountains, Malaysia